Erik Anders Hamrén (born 27 June 1957) is a Swedish manager and former football player, who most recently was the manager of Danish Superliga club AaB. He also previously coached the Sweden national football team between 2009 and 2016 and the Iceland national football team from 2018 to 2020.

Playing career
Hamrén played in local team Ljusdals IF before starting his coaching career. An injury ended his playing career.

Coaching career
Hamrén coached Norwegian team Rosenborg BK to league championship in his first full season with the club. His previous job was as manager of the Danish Superliga side Aalborg BK, where he guided the team to a 5th-place finish in the 2005–06 season, a 3rd place in the 2006–07 season, and to the championship in the 2007–08 season.

Following heavy speculation in Swedish and Norwegian media, it was confirmed on 4 November 2009 that Hamrén would assume part-time responsibility of the Sweden national football team while also managing Rosenborg. This happened until Rosenborg relieved him from his contract on 1 September 2010. From that point, Hamrén would assume full-time responsibilities for the Swedish team. After heavy discussions with RBK (Erik Hoftun, Terje Svendsen, Nils Skutle, Lars Aune), Hamren eventually was confirmed as manager for the Swedish national team.

On 16 October 2012, he presided over a game where the national team finished with a 4–4 draw from 4–0 down in Berlin against Germany in 2014 FIFA World Cup qualification – UEFA Group C. Hamrén qualified Sweden for Euro 2012 and Euro 2016, before stepping down as the manager of Sweden.

On 8 August 2018, Hamrén was named as manager of the Iceland national football team, where he succeeded Heimir Hallgrímsson. On 15 November 2020, following Iceland's failure to qualify for Euro 2020 and their poor performance in the 2020–21 UEFA Nations League A that led to their relegation for the succeeding season, Hamren announced that he would resign as manager after Iceland's last match of the year.

On 15 September 2022 he returned to AaB in the Danish Superliga, when Lars Friis was sacked. On 20 March 2023, Hamrén was sacked after a poor run of results with AaB in last place in the Superliga.

Personal life 

Erik Hamrén was raised primarily in Ljusdal as the son of Pelle, a train dispatcher, and his wife Kerstin. He is married and has two daughters.

Honours

As manager
AIK
 Svenska Cupen: 1995–1996, 1996-1997

Örgryte IS
 Svenska Cupen: 1999–2000

AaB Fodbold
Danish Superliga Championship: 2007–08

Rosenborg
Tippeligaen: 2009, 2010
Superfinalen: 2010

Individual
Danish Football Manager of the Year: 2008
Norwegian Football Manager of the Year: 2009

As technical director
'''Mamelodi Sundowns
Nedbank Cup: 2018

Managerial statistics

References

External links

AaB coaching staff profiles 
 Sweden appointment 
 
 Profile at Eurosport

1957 births
Living people
People from Ljusdal Municipality
AIK Fotboll managers
Rosenborg BK managers
Swedish footballers
Swedish football managers
Sweden national football team managers
AaB Fodbold managers
Örgryte IS managers
IF Brommapojkarna managers
Degerfors IF managers
Väsby IK managers
Expatriate football managers in Denmark
Swedish expatriate football managers
Swedish expatriate sportspeople in Norway
Expatriate football managers in Norway
UEFA Euro 2012 managers
Vasalunds IF managers
UEFA Euro 2016 managers
Association football midfielders
Allsvenskan managers
Danish Superliga managers
Eliteserien managers
Sportspeople from Gävleborg County